Stone pelting in India refers to criminal assault in the form of stone throwing by individuals or mob who pelt, bombard or throw stones at security personnel, police forces and healthcare workers. Stone pelting began with incidents of stone pelting in Kashmir, but became less frequent after the revocation of article 370 of the Constitution of India and the conversion of the state into union territories. These incidents were later reported in Delhi and Uttar Pradesh in 2019 in protest of the citizenship amendment act. In 2020, such incidents started occurring in various parts of India on doctors and policemen after the coronavirus lockdown.

Incidents in Kashmir

In the past, stones were pelted by the Kashmiri Muslim youth at the police in the streets of Srinagar for expressing their anger during 1931 Kashmir agitation. After the rise of insurgency and separatist movement in Kashmir conflict, the stone pelting incidents became prominent in Kashmir from the 2008 Kashmir protests in which the separatist movement had taken a new dimension from gun-fighting with armed forces to the pelting of stones on them. After the year 2008, stone pelting incidents in the valley were reported on regular basis, the prominent among them were recorded in 2010 Kashmir Unrest and 2016-17 Kashmir Unrest, nevertheless minor skirmishes were also reported in those intermediate years. In 2016, Kashmir witnessed 2690 stone pelting incidents in various districts with Baramulla topping the list with 492 incidents followed by Srinagar and Kupwara each with 339 incidents. The least recorded incidents were 65 in Ganderbal. According to official data of state home department, North Kashmir saw the highest number of 1,248 incidents followed by 875 incidents in South Kashmir and 567 in Central Kashmir.

Anti-CAA protests

The incidents of stone pelting were reported in Seelampur (17 December 2019), Ahmedabad (19 December 2019), Jamia Milia Islamia (30 December 2019). On 24 February, violent clashes occurred at Jaffrabad and Maujpur in which one police officer and a protester were killed. The pro-CAA demonstrators and anti-CAA protesters indulged in stone pelting with each other and vandalised houses, vehicles and shops. The police personnel used tear gas and lathi charge against the protestors. Later, it was reported that four protestors also died during the violence.

Coronavirus lockdown
The incidents erupted again during the coronavirus lockdown with the attack on health workers and policemen in Indore, Madhya Pradesh. A similar incident took place in Jaudiya naka, Haryana on 4 May 2019. Gujarat police used tear-gas to contain an incident of stone-pelting in Godhara.

In Uttar Pradesh, people attacked medical staff in Meerut. Four were arrested including Imam after that. Cops were attacked by villagers in Muzaffarnagar while trying to enforce lockdown. SI and constable sustained serious injuries. A mob tried to stop a medical team from taking a coronavirus-infected man into isolation in Moradabad. They hurled stones at an ambulance that left four injured. The injured persons include one doctor and three paramedics. A police vehicle was also damaged in the attack. 17 stone pelters were arrested. Court hearing was held at 3 am, and all 17 of them were jail by 5 am. Five of the arrested stone pelters were later tested positive in COVID-19 tests. Locals pelted stones at Cops in Aligarh as they tried to enforce lockdown, one policeman was injured. CM Yogi Adityanath said that perpetrators be charged under the stringent National Security Act, Epidemic Act and the Disaster Management Act for resorting to violence and preventing the health and police officials from doing their duty. He further ordered to confiscate properties of accused to recover the damages.

The state government later decided to use the UP Recovery of Public and Private Property Ordinance, 2020 against those indulging in violence. 295 accused including many Tablighi Jamaat members were shifted to temporary jails in UP after completing quarantine period. 64 people, including 54 foreign nationals, were lodged in a Saharanpur juvenile home that was converted into a temporary jail. 46 people, including 15 foreign nationals, were lodged in a Jaunpur temporary jail. 45 people, including 16 foreign nationals, were shifted to a temporary jail in Bulandshahr. The numbers for the other districts were: Prayagraj (30, including 16 foreign nationals), Lucknow (23 foreign nationals), Varanasi (22 locals), Sultanpur (17, including 10 foreign nationals) Gyanpur in Bhadohi (14 including 11 foreigners), Moradabad (14), Bijnor (eight foreign nationals), Sitapur (four, including three foreigners) and Agra (seven). All the foreign nationals were members of the Tablighi Jamaat who came to India from Kyrgyzstan, Tajikistan, Bangladesh, Indonesia, Nepal, Sudan, Thailand, Malaysia, Saudi Arabia, France, Palestine, Syria, Mali and Morocco to attend a religious congregation. UP govt sets up 34 temporary jails to lodge Jamaatees. Due to several attacks on the doctors and other health officials and demands from ICMR and Resident Doctors Association, Union Government led by PM Narendra Modi brought an ordinance and announced punishment for the attacker with up to seven years and also fine of up to 5 Lakh rupees.

See also
 Violence against healthcare professionals in India

References

Violence in India